Louis Theroux: Gambling in Las Vegas is a TV documentary written and presented by Louis Theroux. He heads to the Las Vegas Hilton, to reveal the world behind the myths of casino culture. Among the people he meets are two of the casino's 'high-rollers' and an employee who looks after them as well as a retired doctor who says she has gambled away $4 million in seven years. The programme was first broadcast on 4 February 2007 on BBC Two.

Reception
The Times newspaper gave the documentary a positive review. The Sydney Morning Herald commented "There's an element of prurient ogling at the sheer, mind-boggling waste but Theroux also attempts to unravel the troubled relationship between the largesse the casino bestows upon its favourites and the resulting gratitude and loyalty of the gamblers - many of whom fall into the "addicted" category, much as they would deny it."

References

External links
 
 

Louis Theroux's BBC Two specials
BBC television documentaries
2007 television specials
Films shot in the Las Vegas Valley
Films about gambling
Documentary films about cities in the United States
Westgate Las Vegas
Documentary films about Nevada
Television episodes set in Las Vegas
BBC travel television series